The Institute of Puerto Rican Culture, or ICP for short, is an institution of the Government of Puerto Rico responsible for the establishment of the cultural policies required in order to study, preserve, promote, enrich, and diffuse the cultural values of Puerto Rico. Since October 1992, its headquarters have been located at the site of the old colonial Spanish Welfare House in Old San Juan. The ICP was created by order of Law Number 89, signed June 21, 1955, and it started operating in November of that year. Its first Executive Director was Dr. Ricardo Alegría.

Mission
In general terms, the organizational structure of the Institute responds to the functions assigned to it by Law.  Various programs address to the following aspects of the Puerto Rican culture: promote the arts, archeology, museums, parks, monuments, historic zones, music, theater, dance, and the Archives and the National Library of Puerto Rico. It extends its promotion of these throughout all the municipalities of Puerto Rico through local Cultural Centers. These Cultural Centers are autonomous organizations.

Functions

The Institute manages the Puerto Rico General Archives (Archivo General de Puerto Rico) since 1956 as well as the Puerto Rico National Library, has a program on Puerto Rican archeology, sponsors programs in the visual arts, the popular arts and handcrafts, the theatrical arts, and the musical arts, has a branch that publishes books and periodicals, manages a number of museums and parks, and has restored many historic buildings throughout Puerto Rico as part of its historic zones and monuments program. Many of these buildings have been turned into museums. As an example, as part of a project of restoration of the Ponce Historic Zone, the Institute of Puerto Rican Culture assembled a 13-member team to research and survey what changes would need to be implemented for the restoration as that zone.

High-resolution images of works of art from Puerto Rico's museums are being digitized and made available online with the help of the Institute, Google Arts & Culture, Lin Manuel Miranda and other stakeholders. 350 such works were available online by November 7, 2019.

History
In the words of the prominent Puerto Rican sociologist Ricardo Alegría, "There was a need to counteract decades of harmful influences, which at times were openly contradictory to our cultural values, with an effort to promote those values. There was an urgent need to struggle against a psychological conditioning which had become deeply rooted in our colonial society, and which led many Puerto Ricans to systematically diminish anything autochthonous or anything that seemed autochthonous, while disproportionately valuing everything that was foreign, or that seemed foreign."

It was in this social and sociological environment that the Institute of Puerto Rican Culture was born. The bill provoked fierce debate as, for some whose political views were in favor of the direction Puerto Rican politics had been taking in the several years prior to the debate, the bill touched on the very essence of the political status of Puerto Rico. Once the bill was signed into law, the controversy created by the new government institution did not end.

Museums
The Institute operates a number of museums throughout the island. They include:
 Casa Armstrong Poventud - Ponce
 Casa de la Familia Puertorriqueña del Siglo XIX - San Juan
 Casa de la Masacre de Ponce - Ponce
 Casa Jesús T. Piñero - Canóvanas
 Casa Luis Muñoz Rivera - Barranquitas
 Casa Wiechers-Villaronga - Ponce
 Fortín de San Gerónimo - San Juan
 Fuerte Conde Mirasol - Vieques
 Mausoleo Luis Muñoz Rivera - Barranquitas
 Casa Cautiño - Guayama
 Museo de Arte Religioso Santo Domingo de Porta Coeli - San Germán
 Museo Casa Blanca - San Juan
 Museo de la Farmacia - San Juan
 Museo de la Música Puertorriqueña - Ponce
 Museo de Nuestra Raíz Africana - San Juan- closed permanently 
 Museo José Celso Barbosa - Bayamón
 Museo y Parque Histórico Ruinas de Caparra - Guaynabo
 Centro Ceremonial Indígena de Caguana - Utuado

Other institutions
The Institute also owns other properties including the Centro Cultural de Ponce Carmen Solá de Pereira (Ponce Cultural Center).

See also

 Ateneo de Ponce

References

External links
 Instituto de Cultura Puertoriqueña
 Instituto de Cultura Puertorriqueña - YouTube Channel

Government-owned corporations of Puerto Rico
Puerto Rican culture
History of Puerto Rico
1955 establishments in Puerto Rico
Cultural promotion organizations